There are at least 40 named lakes and reservoirs in Calhoun County, Arkansas.

Lakes
Big Johnson Lake, el.  
Cobeen Brake, el.  
Cross Current Brake, el.  
Ditch Lake, el.  
Grapevine Lake, el.  
Mud Lake, el.  
Signboard Brake, el.  
Tupelo Gum Brake, el.  
Big Horseshoe Brake, el.  
Black Lake, el.  
Black Lake Slough, el.  
Blackwater Lakes, el.  
Cages Lake, el.  
Cooks Lake, el.  
Crane Lake, el.  
Duck Roost Lake, el.  
Hades Lake, el.  
Half Moon Lake, el.  
Hollingsworth Brake, el.  
Little Bay Lake, el.  
Little Horseshoe Brake, el.  
Long Lake, el.  
Moro Bay, el.  
Scott Water, el.  
Snow Lake, el.  
Spoon Lake, el.  
Tom Cook Brake, el.  
Viney Brake, el.  
Walker Lake, el.

Reservoirs

Artificial Lake, el.  
Covington Pond, el.  
Harrell Lake, el.  
Lake Cathay, el.  
Lake Lansdale, el.  
Little Mud Lake, el.  
Middle Pond, el.  
North Pond, el.  
Ouachita River Reservoir, el.  
South Pond, el.  
Tri-County Lake, el.

See also
 List of lakes in Arkansas

Notes

Bodies of water of Calhoun County, Arkansas
Calhoun